Keith Robert Brown (born 18 March 1963 Edmonton, Middlesex, England) is a former English first-class cricketer.

Keith Brown was educated at the Chace Comprehensive School, Enfield and he represented Middlesex and Marylebone Cricket Club (MCC) as a right-handed batsman, wicket-keeper and occasional right-arm slow-medium bowler in 247 first-class matches between 1984 and 1998, scoring 10,487 runs (average 35.19; highest score 200 not out) with 499 dismissals (466 catches and 33 stumpings). He was the county's sixth most prolific wicket-keeper.

He also scored 4,749 runs in 248 List A matches (average 29.31; highest score 114) with 217 dismissals (168 catches and 49 stumpings).

He was awarded his county cap in 1990 and a benefit in 1998. He also served as vice-captain under the Middlesex captain Mark Ramprakash. Upon his retirement from first-class cricket in 1998, he became a gamesmaster and form tutor at Bramdean School, Exeter Devon.

External links
 Cricinfo
 Cricket Archive

1963 births
Living people
English cricketers
Marylebone Cricket Club cricketers
Middlesex cricketers
Cricketers from Greater London
Wicket-keepers